The 1989 Virginia Slims of Oklahoma was a women's tennis tournament played on indoor hard courts at The Greens Country Club in Oklahoma City, Oklahoma in the United States and was part of the Category 2 tier of the 1989 Virginia Slims World Championship Series. It was the 4th edition of the tournament and ran from February 27 through March 5, 1989. Unseeded Manon Bollegraf won the singles title and earned $17,000 first-prize money.

Finals

Singles

 Manon Bollegraf defeated  Leila Meskhi 6–4, 6–4
 It was Bollegraf's 2nd title of the year and the 3rd of her career.

Doubles

 Lori McNeil /  Betsy Nagelsen defeated  Elise Burgin /  Elizabeth Smylie by walkover
 It was McNeil's 1st title of the year and the 19th of her career. It was Nagelsen's 2nd title of the year and the 20th of her career.

References

External links
 ITF tournament edition details
 Tournament draws

Virginia Slims of Oklahoma
U.S. National Indoor Championships
Virginia Slims of Oklahoma
Virginia Slims of Oklahoma
Virginia Slims of Oklahoma
Virginia Slims of Oklahoma